Events in the year 1853 in Belgium.

Incumbents
Monarch: Leopold I
Head of government: Henri de Brouckère

Events

 9 April – Prince Leopold sworn in as a member of the Belgian Senate.
 9 June – Aalst railway station opens.
 22 August – Marriage of Leopold, Duke of Brabant, heir to the Belgian throne, and Marie Henriette of Austria.
 23 August – International Maritime Conference opens in Brussels under the chairmanship of Adolphe Quetelet and at the instigation of Matthew Fontaine Maury (ends 8 September)
 19 September – First International Statistical Congress opens in Brussels under the chairmanship of Adolphe Quetelet.

Publications

Periodicals
Almanach royal officiel (Brussels, H. Tarlier)
 Annales de pomologie belge et étrangère (Commission Royale de Pomologie) begins publication.
 Annuaire de la noblesse de Belgique, vol. 5, edited by Isidore de Stein d'Altenstein
 La Belgique Horticole, vol. 3.
 Bulletins de l'Académie Royale des Sciences, des Lettres et des Beaux-Arts de Belgique, vol. 20 (Brussels, M. Hayez)
 Recueil des pièces imprimées par ordre de la Chambre des Représentants, vol. 3.

Guidebooks and directories
 Bradshaw's illustrated hand-book for travellers in Belgium, on the Rhine, and through portions of Rhenish Prussia (London, W.J. Adams)
 Francis Coghlan, The Miniature Guide to the Rhine through Belgium and Holland (London, J. Onwhyn)

Art and architecture

Buildings
 Aalst railway station

Paintings
 Henri Leys, Frans Floris Going to a Saint Luke's Day Feast 1540
 Charles Verlat, Buffalo Ambushed by a Tiger
 Antoine Wiertz, Hunger, Madness and Crime

Births
 31 January – Marie-Elisabeth Belpaire, Flemish activist (died 1948)
 14 February – Jan Van Rijswijck, politician (died 1906)
 20 December – Marie Parent, feminist (died 1934)

Deaths
 11 January – Floris Nollet (born 1794), engineer
 18 January – Antoine Payen the Younger (born 1792), painter
 12 February – Joseph Van Hoorde (born 1818), horticulturalist
 5 March — Hirsch Sommerhausen (born 1781), educator and translator 
 30 April – Edouard Mary (born 1796), social reformer
 3 December – Lazare Richtenberger (born 1792), banker

References

 
Belgium
Years of the 19th century in Belgium
1850s in Belgium
Belgium